Lonsdale (also known as Londsdale) is a village and historic district in Lincoln and Cumberland, Providence County, Rhode Island, United States, near Rhode Island Route 146 and Route 95. The village was originally part of the town of Smithfield until Lincoln was created in the 1870s, and was originally centered on the Lincoln side of the Blackstone River. William Blaxton settled in the area in 1635.  In the nineteenth and early twentieth centuries, Lonsdale was home to several manufacturers including the Lonsdale Company's Bleachery, and the Ann & Hope mill was also located in the village in Cumberland.

The historic district encompasses a variety of mill-related resources in the central part of Lonsdale.  Mill worker housing along Front, John, Lonsdale, and Main Streets is included on the Lincoln side of the Blackstone, while the Ann & Hope factory complex in Cumberland is included, as are mill housing areas on Blackstone Court and on Main, Cross, and Blackstone Streets.

See also
Lonsdale Sports Arena, a race track that operated from 1947 to 1956
National Register of Historic Places listings in Providence County, Rhode Island

References

Further reading
Town of Lincoln, R.I. Once in a hundred years: a pictorial history. Lincoln, R.I.: Centennial publication of the Town of Lincoln R.I., 1971.

External links

URI Records of Christ Church in Lonsdale
Floating Island of Lonsdale by Mildred Laxton Kelley

Villages in Providence County, Rhode Island
Villages in Rhode Island
Historic districts in Providence County, Rhode Island
Lincoln, Rhode Island
Cumberland, Rhode Island
Historic districts on the National Register of Historic Places in Rhode Island
National Register of Historic Places in Providence County, Rhode Island